MakerSquare was a provider of software engineering bootcamp based in Austin, TX, with additional campus locations in San Francisco, CA, Los Angeles, CA and New York, NY. MakerSquare provided a career-focused program that includes job training and employer outreach within its curriculum. In January 2015, MakerSquare was purchased by software engineering bootcamp Hack Reactor, and in 2016, all MakerSquare campuses were rebranded to share the Hack Reactor name.

History
MakerSquare was founded in 2013 by Harsh Patel, Shaan Shah, Shehzan Devani, and Ravi Parikh. The four created the company with no investor funding and initially operated from Parikh's parent's home. MakerSquare was acquired by Hack Reactor in January 2015 for an undisclosed amount. Since the acquisition, MakerSquare has adopted the Hack Reactor curriculum, course structure and name.

Locations
MakerSquare was originally located on Congress Avenue in downtown Austin, TX; however, it was since relocated to the offices of Capital Factory, within the Omni Hotel, still in downtown Austin. MakerSquare opened a second campus in SoMa in San Francisco, CA in 2014 and subsequently two more campuses in Los Angeles (2015) and New York City (2016).

Programs

MakerSquare has adopted the Hack Reactor program which is a course where students spend 12-weeks learning software engineering for 60 to 80 hours a week. Cohorts usually consist of 15 to 30 students with a low student-to-teacher ratio. Students are expected to have an intermediate level understanding of JavaScript before entering. Following completion of the course, MakerSquare students are assisted in their job search by the MakerSquare Student Outcomes team, and connected to their hiring network of 300+ employers. The Student Outcomes staff also provide support for resume preparation, technical interview readiness, personal branding, online presence management, and personal portfolio creation. Immersive courses start every seven weeks. Currently, MakerSquare has achieved a 96% placement rate. Graduate salaries average $106,000 in San Francisco, $92,000 in Los Angeles, and $75,000 in Austin with a 96% success rate of graduates who were placed in a full-time programming job within 3 months of graduation.

MakerSquare offered a part-time course which allowed students to focus on a particular division of web development. MakerSquare's part-time courses were geared towards professionals seeking not to become developers, but to understand more technical aspects of their career. As of November 2014, these classes have been discontinued and have been replaced with MakerPrep, a part-time evenings class for aspiring programmers.

MakerSquare offered a K-12 web development program called Hatch After School in which younger students attend a weekly session to learn programming basics. Consisting of mostly middle school students, Hatch After School consists of three 8-week phase. As of 2015, Hatch After School has been retired.

Student intake and outreach initiatives
The MakerSquare application process includes an online application and technical interview. Accepted students are assigned approximately 75 hours of pre-work that is due prior to the start of their cohort. Currently, MakerSquare has an 18% selectivity rate. The typical MakerSquare student is a college graduate with 4 to 5 years of experience in finance, marketing or.

MakerSquare has created a partnership with 3 Day Startup to offer a scholarship to a 3 Day Startup Alumni. It has also created financial partnerships with Climb Credit and WeFinance to assist students with paying tuition, and is partnered with Thinkful to help students achieve the level of technical proficiency required to pass MakerSquare's technical interview for admission.

References

Organizations based in Austin, Texas
Education in Austin, Texas
Organizations based in Los Angeles
Education in Los Angeles
Organizations based in San Francisco
Education in San Francisco